Atıl Kutoğlu (born 1968 in Istanbul, Turkey) is a Turkish fashion designer residing in Vienna. Kutoğlu launched his clothing label in 1992 which uses Turkish influences and culture and presents them in a modern way. He is known for dressing celebrities and artists from all over the world.

Awards
 2013 Vienna Fashion Award as Global Citizen

References

External links
 
 

1968 births
Living people
Turkish fashion designers
Austrian fashion designers
Deutsche Schule Istanbul alumni
Austrian people of Turkish descent
Turkish emigrants to Austria
Naturalised citizens of Austria